IEEE 802.11g-2003 or 802.11g is an amendment to the IEEE 802.11 specification that operates in the 2.4 GHz microwave band. The standard has extended throughput to up to 54 Mbit/s using the same 20 MHz bandwidth as 802.11b uses to achieve 11 Mbit/s.  This specification under the marketing name of Wi-Fi has been implemented all over the world.  The 802.11g protocol is now Clause 19 of the published IEEE 802.11-2007 standard, and Clause 19 of the published IEEE 802.11-2012 standard.

802.11 is a set of IEEE standards that govern wireless networking transmission methods. They are commonly used today in their 802.11a, 802.11b, 802.11g, 802.11n, 802.11ac and 802.11ax versions to provide wireless connectivity in the home, office and some commercial establishments.

802.11g is fully backward compatible with 802.11b, but coexistance of the two methods incur a signifcant performance penalty.

Descriptions 
802.11g is the third modulation standard for wireless LANs.  It works in the 2.4 GHz band (like 802.11b) but operates at a maximum raw data rate of 54 Mbit/s. Using the CSMA/CA transmission scheme, 31.4 Mbit/s is the maximum net throughput possible for packets of 1500 bytes in size and a 54 Mbit/s wireless rate (identical to 802.11a core, except for some additional legacy overhead for backward compatibility). In practice, access points may not have an ideal implementation and may therefore not be able to achieve even 31.4 Mbit/s throughput with 1500 byte packets. 1500 bytes is the usual limit for packets on the Internet and therefore a relevant size to benchmark against. Smaller packets give even lower theoretical throughput, down to 3 Mbit/s using 54 Mbit/s rate and 64 byte packets. Also, the available throughput is shared between all stations transmitting, including the AP so both downstream and upstream traffic is limited to a shared total of 31.4 Mbit/s using 1500 byte packets and 54 Mbit/s rate.

802.11g hardware is fully backward compatible with 802.11b hardware. Details of making b and g work well together occupied much of the lingering technical process. In an 802.11g network, however, the presence of a legacy 802.11b participant will significantly reduce the speed of the overall 802.11g network, as airtime needs to be managed by RTS/CTS transmissions and a "back off" mechanism. Some 802.11g routers employ a back-compatible mode for 802.11b clients called 54g LRS (Limited Rate Support).

The modulation scheme used in 802.11g is orthogonal frequency-division multiplexing (OFDM) copied from 802.11a with data rates of 6, 9, 12, 18, 24, 36, 48, and 54 Mbit/s, and reverts to CCK (like the 802.11b standard) for 5.5 and 11 Mbit/s and DBPSK/DQPSK+DSSS for 1 and 2 Mbit/s.  Even though 802.11g operates in the same frequency band as 802.11b, it can achieve higher data rates because of its better modulation from 802.11a.

Technical description 
Of the 52 OFDM subcarriers, 48 are for data and 4 are pilot subcarriers with a carrier separation of 0.3125 MHz (20 MHz/64). Each of these subcarriers can be a BPSK, QPSK, 16-QAM or 64-QAM. The total bandwidth is 22 MHz with an occupied bandwidth of 16.6 MHz. Symbol duration is 4 microseconds, which includes a guard interval of 0.8 microseconds. The actual generation and decoding of orthogonal components is done in baseband using DSP which is then upconverted to 2.4 GHz at the transmitter. Each of the subcarriers could be represented as a complex number. The time domain signal is generated by taking an Inverse Fast Fourier transform (IFFT). Correspondingly the receiver downconverts, samples at 20 MHz and does an FFT to retrieve the original coefficients. The advantages of using OFDM include reduced multipath effects in reception and increased spectral efficiency.

Adoption
The then-proposed 802.11g standard was rapidly adopted by consumers starting in January 2003, well before ratification, due to the desire for higher speeds and reductions in manufacturing costs. By mid-2003, most dual-band 802.11a/b products became dual-band/tri-mode, supporting a and b/g in a single mobile adapter card or access point. 

Despite its major acceptance, 802.11g suffers from the same interference as 802.11b in the already crowded 2.4 GHz range.  Devices operating in this range include microwave ovens, Bluetooth devices, baby monitors, and digital cordless telephones, which can lead to interference issues.  Additionally, the success of the standard has caused usage/density problems related to crowding in urban areas.  To prevent interference, there are only three non-overlapping usable channels in the U.S. and other countries with similar regulations (channels 1, 6, 11, with 25 MHz separation), and four in Europe (channels 1, 5, 9, 13, with only 20 MHz separation). Even with such separation, some interference due to side lobes exists, though it is considerably weaker.

Channels and frequencies

Notes:
 Not all channels are legal to use in all countries. In particular, no countries in the world permit the use of channel 14 for 802.11g. Channels 12 and 13 are avoided in the United States due to a misinterpretation of regulations.
 Overlaps noted with an asterisk (*) indicate overlap only in the 22MHz width, while 802.11g only requires 20MHz (the actual occupied bandwidth is even lower, 16.25 MHz). As a result, such overlaps have minimal performance implications.

Comparison

See also
 List of WLAN channels
 OFDM system comparison table
 Spectral efficiency comparison table
 Wi-Fi
 Super G (wireless networking)
 Xpress technology

References
 

G

ja:IEEE 802.11#IEEE 802.11g